Antarctic Pioneers is a 1963 Australian documentary about Australia's history of Antarctic exploration from Sir Douglas Mawson's first expedition in 1911, to the 1954 expedition, under Phillip Law, which established a permanent Australian base on the continent. It was part of the Australia Today series.

It was narrated by Frank Hurley, who died only a few weeks after the movie's completion.

References

External links
Antarctic Pioneers at Australian Screen Online

Australian short documentary films
Documentary films about Antarctica
1963 films
1963 documentary films
1963 short films
1960s short documentary films
Australia and the Antarctic
Films directed by Lee Robinson
1960s English-language films